Tia and Tamara Mowry may refer to:

Actresses Tia Mowry and Tamera Mowry.

Most commonly known for Sister, Sister (TV series), a television sitcom starring Tia and Tamera Mowry. Where they were separated at birth and reunited.